Cliviinae is a small subtribe of Haemantheae, and therefore within the African clades of Amaryllidoideae. It consists of two genera, Clivia, and Cryptostephanus.

Description 

Bulbless rhizomatous perennial plants. Clivia has showy orange or yellow flowers, while Cryptostephanus has smaller flowers with a paraperigone that had them erroneously classified with Narcissus in the past. it is also the only Haemantheae genus with a phytomelanous seed testa.

Taxonomy 
For the early taxonomic history of these two genera, see Meerow and Clayton (2004). (Traub described this grouping as tribe Clivieae in his 1963 monograph on the Amaryllidaceae, based on the type genus Clivia.  . Subsequently, the Müller-Doblies' reduced it to a subtribe and placed it within the Haemantheae. Later molecular phylogenetic research has confirmed this placement, with Cliviinae being one of three subtribes of Haemantheae.

Phylogeny 
The Cliviinae are placed within the Haemantheae as follows:

Subdivision 
 Clivia  (5 species)
 Cryptostephanus (2 species)

Distribution and habitat 
Clivia is found in summer rainfall regions, as herbaceous understory plants of coastal and Afro-montane forest, while Cryptostephanus are plants of savanna or forest habitats.

Ecology 
Butterfly and sunbird pollination.

References

Bibliography

External links

Amaryllidoideae
Garden plants of Southern Africa
Flora of Southern Africa
Flora of Africa
Plant subtribes